Granville Leveson-Gower, 1st Marquess of Stafford, KG PC (4 August 172126 October 1803), known as Viscount Trentham from 1746 to 1754 and as The Earl Gower from 1754 to 1786, was a British politician from the Leveson-Gower family.

Background
Stafford was a son of John Leveson-Gower, 1st Earl Gower (1694–1754) and his wife Lady Evelyn Pierrepont. His maternal grandparents were Evelyn Pierrepont, 1st Duke of Kingston-upon-Hull and his first wife Lady Mary Feilding. Mary was a daughter of William Feilding, 3rd Earl of Denbigh and his wife Mary King. His father was a prominent Tory politician who became the first major Tory to enter government since the succession of George I of Great Britain, joining the administration of John Carteret, 2nd Earl Granville in 1742. Gower was educated at Westminster School and Christ Church, Oxford.

Political and industrial investment career
Stafford was elected to parliament in 1744.  
With the death of his elder brother in 1746, he became known by the courtesy title of Viscount Trentham until he succeeded his father as Earl Gower in 1754. He built the earlier Lilleshall Hall, converting a 17th-century house located in the village of Lilleshall into a country residence around the late 1750s.

Stafford was associated with the faction of John Russell, Duke of Bedford, who was his brother-in-law, and as a member of that faction, called the "Bloomsbury Gang", was given many governmental positions.  Following Bedford's death in 1771, Gower became leader of the group, and as Lord President in the administration of Frederick North, Lord North, he was a key supporter of a hard-line policy towards the American colonists. Between 1775 and 1778, Stafford proceeded to make substantial alterations to his home at Trentham Hall based on the designs by Henry Holland.

By 1779, Gower resigned from the cabinet being frustrated by what he saw as the North administration's inept handling of the American Revolutionary War.  When North resigned in March 1782, Gower was approached to form a ministry, but he refused, and he refused subsequent overtures from both Lord Shelburne and the Fox-North coalition to enter the government.  Instead, he became a key figure in bringing about the fall of the Fox-North coalition, and was rewarded with the position of Lord President once again in the new administration of William Pitt the Younger. Although he soon exchanged this office for that of Lord Privy Seal, and gradually began to withdraw from public affairs, he remained a cabinet minister until his retirement later in 1794. In 1786, he was created Marquess of Stafford as a reward for his services. He was elected F.S.A. on 28 April 1784.

In 1799 he (or his immediate family benefit trust) was estimated the fifth-wealthiest small family unit in Britain, owning £2.1M, having assets in land, mining and arterial canal-toll rights having speculatively invested in the latter projects, much of which was in Staffordshire's Black Country.

He died at Trentham Hall, Staffordshire, on 26 October 1803. He was the last surviving member of the Bloomsbury Gang.

Marriages and children 

Stafford married three times. He married firstly Elizabeth Fazakerley, daughter of Nicholas Fazakerley with a dowry of £16,000 on 23 December 1744. She died on 19 May 1745 of smallpox. They had no children.
  
Stafford married secondly Lady Louisa Egerton, daughter of Scroop Egerton, 1st Duke of Bridgewater, in 1748. She died in 1761. They were parents to four children:
Lady Louisa Leveson-Gower (22 Oct 1749-29 July 1827). She married Sir Archibald MacDonald, 1st Baronet.
Lady Margaret Caroline Leveson-Gower (02 Nov 1753-27 January 1824). She married Frederick Howard, 5th Earl of Carlisle and was the mother of George Howard, 6th Earl of Carlisle.
George Leveson-Gower, 1st Duke of Sutherland (9 January 175819 July 1833).
Lady Anne Leveson-Gower (22 Feb 1761-16 November 1832). She married the Right Reverend the Hon. Edward Venables-Vernon-Harcourt, Archbishop of York.

Stafford married thirdly Lady Susanna Stewart, daughter of Alexander Stewart, 6th Earl of Galloway, 23 May 1768. They were parents to four children:
Lady Georgiana Augusta Leveson-Gower (13 Apr 176924 March 1806). She married William Eliot, 2nd Earl of St Germans.
Lady Charlotte Sophia Leveson-Gower (11 Feb 1771; christened 12 Feb 1771 St Martin in the Fields, Westminster12 August 1854). She married Henry Somerset, 6th Duke of Beaufort and was mother of Henry Somerset, 7th Duke of Beaufort and Lord Granville Somerset.
Lady Susanna Leveson-Gower (born Sep 1772; christened 15 Sep 1772 Trentham26 May 1838). She married Dudley Ryder, 1st Earl of Harrowby.
Granville Leveson-Gower, 1st Earl Granville (born 12 October 1773, christened 5 Nov 1773 Trentham8 January 1846).
When Lord Stafford died at the age of 82, he was succeeded in his titles by his eldest son George from his second marriage who was created Duke of Sutherland in 1833. The Marchioness of Stafford died in August 1805.

References

Attribution

External links

 

1721 births
1803 deaths
Lord-Lieutenants of Staffordshire
Lord Presidents of the Council
Lords Privy Seal
Trentham, Granville Leveson-Gower, Viscount
British MPs 1741–1747
British MPs 1747–1754
British MPs 1754–1761
Members of the Privy Council of Great Britain
Granville Leveson-Gower, 1st Marquess of Stafford
People educated at Westminster School, London
Alumni of Christ Church, Oxford
Marquesses of Stafford
Lords of the Admiralty